John Smale may refer to:
 John G. Smale, American businessman
 Sir John Jackson Smale, British lawyer and judge